Denis Zvizdić (born 9 June 1964) is a Bosnian politician who served as Chairman of the Council of Ministers of Bosnia and Herzegovina from 2015 to 2019. He is currently a member of the House of Representatives and has also served as Prime Minister of Sarajevo Canton from 2003 to 2006.

Zvidzić was a prominent figure of the Party of Democratic Action, until he left it in 2021 to join the People and Justice party.

Early life and education
Zvizdić was born on 9 June 1964 in Sarajevo. He studied at the Faculty of Architecture of the University of Sarajevo, where he earned a PhD and in 2007 became a professor of architecture.

Early career
Zvizdić had worked at the Ministry for Environment and Construction of the Republic of Bosnia and Herzegovina and of the Federation of Bosnia and Herzegovina (FBiH), as well as for the Unioninvest Sarajevo Company prior to his political career. He was also Co-Director of the National Action Plan for Protection of Environment.

Early political career
In 2003, Zvizdić became Prime Minister of the Sarajevo Canton - his first major political appointment - and in 2006 speaker of the Sarajevo Cantonal Assembly. 

He was then a member of the Federal Parliament (House of Peoples, 2006–10; House of Representatives, 2010–14).

Zvizdić was a member of the Party of Democratic Action (SDA) from 1991 until 2021, after which he joined the People and Justice party. He was a member of its Presidency from 2005. In 2009, Zvizdić was appointed Chair of the SDA Council and joined the party's Main Board in 2013. He was a member of the party Cantonal Board in Sarajevo (2004–05), and prior to that member of the Sarajevo Centar Municipal Board (2000–03).

Chairman of the Council of Ministers (2015–2019)

On 31 March 2015, in a vote in the national House of Representatives determining the new Chairman of the Council of Ministers of Bosnia and Herzegovina, 28 out of the 42 Parliament members voted for Zvizdić, 5 voted against and 2 abstained. Zvizdić promised that his government would improve action on the accession of Bosnia and Herzegovina to the European Union. 

During his premiership, the SAA agreement with the EU entered into force on 15 July 2015, and on 15 February 2016, Bosnia and Herzegovina submitted its EU membership application.

In July 2016, Zvizdić's government approved a comprehensive anti-discrimination law which has to do with LGBT rights in Bosnia and Herzegovina, banning discrimination on account of one's sexual orientation, gender identity and sex characteristics. Later on, the Parliament adopted the law. This came after the Law Against Discrimination was adopted in 2009, prohibiting discrimination based on sex, gender expression and sexual orientation. Furthermore, the law forbids harassment and segregation on the basis of sexual orientation. The country's desire to join the EU has also played an important role in the government's approach to LGBT rights.

After the 2018 general election and with a newly established government, on 23 December 2019, Zvizdić was succeeded as Chairman of the Council of Ministers by Zoran Tegeltija of the Alliance of Independent Social Democrats (SNSD).

Personal life
On 8 February 2021, it was confirmed that Zvizdić tested positive for COVID-19, amid its pandemic in Bosnia and Herzegovina.

References

External links

Denis Zvizdić at imovinapoliticara.cin.ba

1964 births
Living people
Politicians from Sarajevo
Architects from Sarajevo
Bosnia and Herzegovina Muslims
University of Sarajevo alumni
Academic staff of the University of Sarajevo
Politicians of the Bosnian War
Politicians of the Federation of Bosnia and Herzegovina
Party of Democratic Action politicians
People and Justice politicians
Members of the House of Representatives (Bosnia and Herzegovina)
Chairmen of the House of Representatives (Bosnia and Herzegovina)